The Elite is a team of fictional super-powered antiheroes appearing in American comic books published by DC Comics, in particular those featuring Superman and The Justice League. They are DC's response to Wildstorm's The Authority. The Elite made their first appearance in the story "What's So Funny About Truth, Justice & the American Way?", published in Action Comics #775 (March 2001). The story, which was voted number 1 in Wizard magazine's "Top Ten Comics of the Decade", was written by Joe Kelly, inked by Tom Nguyen and penciled by Doug Mahnke and Lee Bermejo. They appeared as antagonists before some of the characters merged with members of the Justice League to form the Justice League Elite.

Fictional team history

Team members

 Manchester Black is the team's first leader. A British telekinetic vigilante, currently inactive after realizing that he had become as bad as the villains that he wanted to fight. His Union Jack shirt echoes the Authority's Jenny Sparks.
 Vera Black is a British psionic cyborg, sister of Manchester Black and the second leader of the Elite.
 Coldcast is a very large and muscular African-American man who wore dreadlocks and chains and manacles around his neck and wrists. He is capable of manipulating electromagnetism. He was eventually inspired by Superman to fight on the side of heroes.
 The first Menagerie is a Puerto Rican woman with a symbiotic suit of armor that allows her to transform into a chimeric creature. She was lobotomized and rendered comatose.
 The second Menagerie is the sister of Menagerie I. She joins with an alien weapon cache that drives her insane, and later is incarcerated in a metahuman prison facility.
 The Hat is a young and powerful Asian Earth elemental with a measure of invulnerability and an ability to breathe fire. He is armed with a magic hat from which he can pull any item he desires, summon demons, and wield magic. He quits the team shortly after Vera Black takes over.
 Bunny is a bacterial colony that became a floating fortress before the Elite brought her to their universe to use as a base of operations. It contains many wonders, such as Excalibur and the skeleton of Pegasus.

Collected editions
All appearances of The Elite apart from Action Comics #795 have been reprinted in trade paperbacks:

 Justice League Elite: 
 Volume 1 (collects: Action Comics #775, JLA #100, JLA Secret Files 2004, and Justice League Elite #1–4, 208 pages, 2005)
 Volume 2 (collects  Justice League Elite #5–12, 192 pages, 2007)
 Superman: The Greatest Stories Ever Told Volume 1 (includes Action Comics #775, 192 pages)

In other media
 The Elite appeared in the fourth season of Supergirl with Manchester Black portrayed by David Ajala, Menagerie by Jessica Merez, and Hat by Louis Ozawa Changchien. It is formed by Manchester Black (who is just a normal human in this version, though he has at times used enhanced weaponry or armor), along with Menagerie (who is bonded with a serpentine alien symbiote), Hat (an alien whose hat has 5th Dimension properties), and Morae that's nicknamed "Mo" in response to the bigotry of Ben Lockwood and the Children of Liberty as well as the ineffectiveness of the government and D.E.O. Manchester recruits Menagerie and Hat while in jail and they break out alongside the unnamed Morae. Believing that the government can't be trusted and superheroes will not stop killers who don't share their principles, they set out to kill the Children of Liberty and anyone else who would harm earthbound aliens, daring Supergirl to challenge them. They steal Brainiac 5's Legion Ring for Manchester Black and attempt to have the Claymore satellite - originally created to destroy alien ships within Earth's vicinity - fire at the White House. Menagerie is captured before an assassination attempt on Lockwood and the remaining members steal equipment from the Fortress of Solitude which they use to incite violence at a peaceful alien protest against an anti-alien rally. Supergirl and her friends are able to defeat and arrest Mo and Hat. Manchester remained as the last member when he attempted to destroy dam and flood National City, only to be killed by Martian Manhunter (J'onn J'onzz), ending the Elite.
 The Elite appeared in Superman vs. The Elite, with Manchester Black voiced by Robin Atkin Downes, Vera Black by Marcella Lentz-Pope, Coldcast by Catero Colbert, Menagerie by Melissa Disney, and Hat by Andrew Kishino. The Elite is initially better received than Superman by the public for simply killing superpowered criminals, thus providing instant results after Atomic Skull escaped and went on a killing spree. The Elite grow to become darker and eventually tyrannical over the course of weeks and appear to kill Superman when he opposes them. After Superman returns and defeats them in a terrifying rampage, seeming to slaughter them without mercy as he tells them that he’s going to do things their way now, he reveals that he actually showed mercy and simply disabled the Elite's powers. Public opinion switches back to Superman.

References

External links
 

2001 comics debuts
DC Comics superhero teams
Characters created by Joe Kelly
DC Comics supervillain teams